The London XI was a football team that represented the city of London in the 1955–58 Inter-Cities Fairs Cup.

The competition began in 1955, and the first tournament took three years to complete. The entrants were the major football team of each city which held a Trade Fair. Like many cities taking part, London had several strong teams; however, rules stated that there could only be a single team from each city. Therefore, a representative team was created especially for the tournament, using the best players from the 11 Greater London-based Football League clubs. Membership of the team varied considerably between matches, and some 54 players took part in the team's eight-match campaign.

The London XI, managed by Chelsea chairman Joe Mears, reached the final of the cup, after coming top of a group that included special XI teams from Basel and Frankfurt, and then beating Lausanne Sports. London lost 8–2 on aggregate over two legs to FC Barcelona.

The London XI only competed in the 1955–58 Inter-Cities Fairs Cup. Thereafter, London was represented in the competition by individual clubs who qualified.

A unified London side competed in friendly matches even earlier: a "London" team represented the FA in the historic 1866 London v Sheffield match, there were several challenges against the Glasgow FA during the 1880s, and "London" lost 4-2 to Corinthians on 21 November 1903 in front of 1500, described as Corinthians "had an easy task" in a 1904 Times article. Two other matches have been referenced – an "annual match" versus Birmingham on 3 October 1910 and a match versus Paris on 18 December 1910.

Teams and match details

Clubs represented

 Arsenal
 Brentford
 Charlton Athletic
 Chelsea

 Crystal Palace
 Fulham
 Leyton Orient
 Millwall

 Queens Park Rangers
 Tottenham Hotspur
 West Ham United

Group stage

Team Ron Reynolds (Tottenham), Peter Sillett (Chelsea), Jim Fotheringham (Arsenal), Stan Willemse (Chelsea), Ken Armstrong (Chelsea), Derek Saunders (Chelsea), Harry Hooper (West Ham), Johnny Haynes (Fulham), Cliff Holton (Arsenal), Eddie Firmani (Charlton), Billy Kiernan (Charlton).Substitute: Brian Nicholas (QPR), on for Saunders 37′.

Team Ted Ditchburn (Tottenham), Peter Sillett (Chelsea), Stan Willemse (Chelsea), Danny Blanchflower (Tottenham), Charlie Hurley (Millwall), Cyril Hammond (Charlton), Vic Groves (Orient), Bobby Robson (Fulham), Bedford Jezzard (Fulham), Roy Bentley (Chelsea), Charlie Mitten (Fulham).

Team Jack Kelsey (Arsenal), Peter Sillett (Chelsea), John Hewie (Charlton), Danny Blanchflower (Tottenham), Stan Wicks (Chelsea), Ken Coote (Brentford), Jim Lewis (Chelsea), Derek Tapscott (Arsenal), Cliff Holton (Arsenal), Bobby Cameron (QPR), George Robb (Tottenham).

Team Ron Reynolds (Tottenham), John Bond (West Ham), Peter Sillett (Chelsea), Ken Armstrong (Chelsea), Malcolm Allison (West Ham), Tony Marchi (Tottenham), Terry Medwin (Tottenham), Stuart Leary (Charlton), David Herd (Arsenal), Johnny Haynes (Fulham), Billy Kiernan (Charlton).

Semi-finals

Team Ted Ditchburn (Tottenham), Stan Charlton (Arsenal), Dennis Evans (Arsenal), Brian Nicholas (Chelsea), Jim Fotheringham (Arsenal), Phil McKnight (Orient), Peter Berry (Crystal Palace), Geoff Truett (Crystal Palace), Les Stubbs (Chelsea), Phil Woosnam (Orient), Joe Haverty (Arsenal).

Team Jack Kelsey (Arsenal), Stan Charlton (Arsenal), Peter Sillett (Chelsea), Ken Coote (Brentford), Bill Dodgin (Arsenal), Derek Saunders (Chelsea), Roy Dwight (Fulham), Jimmy Greaves (Chelsea), Cliff Holton (Arsenal), Johnny Haynes (Fulham), Billy Kiernan (Charlton).

London XI won 3–2 on aggregate.

Final

Team Jack Kelsey (Arsenal), Peter Sillett (Chelsea), Jim Langley (Fulham), Danny Blanchflower (Tottenham), Maurice Norman (Tottenham), Ken Coote (Brentford), Vic Groves (Arsenal), Jimmy Greaves (Chelsea), Bobby Smith (Tottenham), Johnny Haynes (Fulham), George Robb (Tottenham).

Team Jack Kelsey (Arsenal), George Wright (Orient), Noel Cantwell (West Ham), Danny Blanchflower (Tottenham), Ken Brown (West Ham), Dave Bowen (Arsenal), Terry Medwin (Tottenham), Vic Groves (Arsenal), Bobby Smith (Tottenham), Jimmy Bloomfield (Arsenal), Jim Lewis (Chelsea).

Barcelona XI won 8–2 on aggregate.

London v Glasgow 

8 matches played;
London: 2 wins (15 goals);
Glasgow: 5 wins (27 goals);
1 draw.

See also
Football in London
Football in England
List of football clubs in England
Copenhagen XI
Madrid autonomous football team

Notes

References

External links
Details of the 1955–58 Fairs Cup

Inter-Cities Fairs Cup
Football in London
1955 establishments in England
1958 disestablishments in England
Football teams in England
Football combination XI teams
Association football clubs established in 1955